Zolsky (masculine), Zolskaya (feminine), or Zolskoye (neuter) may refer to:

Zolsky District, a district of the Kabardino-Balkar Republic, Russia
Zolsky (rural locality) (Zolskaya, Zolskoye), name of several rural localities in Russia